Bicou Bissainthe (born 15 March 1999) is a Haitian professional footballer who plays as a midfielder for Haiphong FC.

Career
In January 2019, Bissainthe joined North Texas SC ahead of their inaugural season in USL League One. He made his league debut for the club on March 30, 2019, coming on as a 68th minute substitute for Arturo Rodriguez in a 3-2 home victory over Chattanooga Red Wolves SC.

On 5 August 2021, Armenian Premier League club Sevan announced the singing of Bissainthe.

FC Edmonton 
On 22 April 2022, it was announced that Bissainthe had signed with Canadian Premier League club Pacific FC and would be immediately loaned to FC Edmonton. The club was in a state of crisis the season Bissanthe joined, with no ownership and most players also being at the club on loan (the league gave Edmonton a special exemption from loan player limits). Nevertheless, the Eddies fought bravely in a difficult season, and in their 12th game of the year Bissainthe scored the only goal in a game against Atlético Ottawa to give Edmonton their first victory of the year.

Haiphong FC 
On January 2023 it was announced that Bissainthe had signed with V.League 1 club Haiphong FC. The following day he made his debut for the club, in the 2022 Vietnamese Super Cup against Hanoi FC.

Career statistics

International

References

External links
 
 

1999 births
Living people
Haitian footballers
Haitian expatriate footballers
Haitian expatriate sportspeople in the United States
Association football midfielders
North Texas SC players
USL League One players
2019 CONCACAF Gold Cup players
Haiti international footballers
Expatriate soccer players in the United States
People from Cap-Haïtien